William Unwin Heygate (12 March 1825 - 2 March 1902) was a British Conservative Member of Parliament and Leicestershire politician.

Biography
Heygate was born on 12 March 1825, the second son of Sir William Heygate, 1st Baronet (1782-1844), Member of Parliament and Lord Mayor of London.  He was educated at Eton College and Merton College, Oxford, where he was awarded a B. A. in 1847 and an M. A. in 1850. He became a pupil at Lincoln's Inn on 6 November 1846 and was called to the bar on 19 November 1850.

After unsuccessfully contesting Bridport in 1857, Heygate entered the Parliament for the Conservative Party from Leicester in 1861, but was defeated in the 1865 General election. He returned briefly as a member from Stamford in a by-election in 1868 (the constituency was abolished later the same year), and was again elected for South Leicestershire in 1870, serving until he stepped down in 1880.

Heygate was a prominent politician in Leicestershire. He was an Alderman of Leicestershire County Council, a Justice of the peace and a Deputy Lieutenant of the county. In business, he was Chairman of Pare′s Leicestershire Banking Company, a director of the Midland Railway, and of the Canada Company.

Heygate died at the Hotel Burlington, in Dover, 2 March 1902.

Family
Heygate married, Constance Mary Beaumont, daughter of Sir George Beaumont, on 6 July 1852. The couple had four children:
 William Howley Beaumont Heygate (20 May 1854 – 21 September 1928)
 Reginald Beaumont Heygate (10 October 1857 – 5 January 1903)
 Mary Florence Heygate (16 January 1861 – 1 July 1929)
 Harry Beaumont Heygate (8 Feb 1872 – 20 July 1897)

References

External links 
 

1825 births
1902 deaths
Conservative Party (UK) MPs for English constituencies
UK MPs 1859–1865
UK MPs 1868–1874
UK MPs 1874–1880
Alumni of Merton College, Oxford
Members of Lincoln's Inn
Younger sons of baronets
People educated at Eton College
English barristers